The Bank of the Holy Spirit was a bank founded by Pope Paul V on December 13, 1605. The bank was the first national bank in Europe (as the bank of the Papal States), the first public deposit bank in Rome, and the oldest continuously operating bank in Rome until its merger in 1992.

First period (1605–1923)

The Bank was founded by Pope Paul V in the Bench of S. Spirit building (which became known as the Palazzo del Banco di S. Spirito) on December 13, 1605. The construction of the building was started in 1513 by Pope Leo X, on what became known as the "Street of the Banks." The newly founded bank provided a new source of income for the Archhospital of Santo Spirito (founded 1201), whose financial difficulties had been increasing throughout the 16th century, and in 1607 the bank began supervising the finances of the hospital, which owned the bank.

From February 20, 1606, to 1923, the Bank of the Holy Spirit provided capital for churches and hospitals constructed in Rome, and other commercial purposes. The bank lent funds to several public works projects, including the Trajan aqueduct project (Begun 1608).

In 1750, Pope Benedict XIV, known for his condemnation of usury: Vix pervenit (promulgated November 1, 1745), reorganized the Bank and restricted its lending activities. In 1786, the bank became one of the first to issue paper money during the pontificate of Pope Pius VI.

The records of the Bank are extant in the Vatican Secret Archives, but not in Introitus et Exitus, the records of the Apostolic Camera.

1923–92
In 1923, the Bank was reorganized as a joint-stock company. In 1935, the Istituto per la Ricostruzione Industriale (IRI) of the fascist Italian government gained a controlling interest in the bank.

In the 1930s, Neapolitan bank robbers attempting to dig into the underground vaults of the Bank accidentally discovered the skeletons of victims of an 1836 cholera epidemic, which after archeological excavation became known as the Fontanelle cemetery.

Merger
In 1992, the Bank of the Holy Spirit—which had previously merged with the Cassa di Risparmio di Roma (est. 1836) in 1989— merged with the Banco di Roma (est. 1880) to form the Banca di Roma, which subsequently merged with other banks in 2002 to form Capitalia.

See also

Vatican Bank
Banco Ambrosiano

References

Economic history of the Holy See
Banks established in 1605
1605 establishments in the Papal States
Defunct banks of Italy
Capitalia Group
Banks disestablished in 1992
1992 disestablishments in Italy
History of banking